Nightlife is an American syndicated half-hour late-night talk show hosted by comedian David Brenner that aired weeknights from September 8, 1986, to June 19, 1987. Produced by Motown Productions in association with King World Productions, the show was filmed in New York City and featured a house band led by Billy Preston.

History

Background
In February 1986, at the annual National Association of Television Program Executives (NATPE) conference, Nightlife was pitched as a late-night alternative to NBC talk shows The Tonight Show Starring Johnny Carson and Late Night with David Letterman.
David Brenner was a frequent guest and regular fill-in host on Tonight, much like another comic, Joan Rivers, whose own talk show debuted a month after Nightlife. But whereas Rivers angered Carson by planning her show without consulting her mentor, Brenner spoke with Carson about his plans and received his blessing.
Brenner said "there's no animosity between me and them."
The syndicated Nightlife, produced by Motown Productions in association with King World Productions, premiered on September 8, 1986, on 102 stations, approximately one-third of which were ABC affiliates.

Format
Nightlife was unique among late-night talk shows of the era in that it was a half-hour program, not a full hour. Brenner dressed more casually than other hosts, wearing sweaters instead of suit jackets. The show often opened with a comedy sketch rather than a traditional monologue. A notable exception came on October 17, 1986, when Brenner gave an extended monologue through two commercial breaks and until the closing credits. Reports indicated that none of the scheduled guests showed up, but Brenner's publicist claimed that the monologue was intentional.
The show's house band was Billy Preston and the Nightlife Band. Preston, who appeared in the billing – Nightlife starring David Brenner with Billy Preston – was the first African-American music director of a national television talk show. New York radio personality Dan Ingram was the show's announcer.

Ratings and cancellation
In its first two months on air, Nightlife averaged a 2.4 rating. A November 1986 Broadcasting article said that the show had "gotten lost in the shuffle over the Carson and Rivers shows."
November ratings fell to a 1.9, and by January 1987, David Smith, associate director of programming at Katz Communications, said that Nightlife would probably not return for a second season.
King World and Motown Productions announced in April that they will complete the show's 195-episode commitment, though it was not officially cancelled for another two months.
The final original episode of Nightlife aired in June, with reruns continuing through August.

Brenner told TV columnist Gary Deeb that when ratings "didn't go through the roof" in the first month, many stations then decided to move the show from the more desirable  – midnight time periods to the middle of the night. Brenner added that King World "started cutting our budget and started making us do a lotta pre-taped shows – and you could see the handwriting. I mean – it was more than handwriting – it was chiseling on the wall." King World head executive Michael King said the talent pool of available guests was "somewhat of a problem. But we weren't up against Joan Rivers for the most part. We were up against the last half-hour of Carson or the first half-hour of David Letterman." Ultimately, King argued, "the public just didn't want to tune into David every night". In a 2009 interview with The Trentonian, Brenner said that Motown and King World "ended up not liking to work with each other, and so they didn't care that the ratings were good, that the show was great and all that -- all they cared was to get away from each other. So you could say that I became the child of divorced parents".

See also
List of late-night American network TV programs

References

External links
"Brenner's 'Nightlife' A Little Too Eclectic". Daley, Steve. Chicago Tribune (September 12, 1986)
"Sticking His Nose in the Late Night Talk-Show Race, David Brenner Comes Up Smelling Like a Winner". Bernstein, Fred. People (September 22, 1986)

1986 American television series debuts
1987 American television series endings
1980s American television talk shows
1980s American late-night television series
1980s American variety television series
English-language television shows
First-run syndicated television programs in the United States
Television series by King World Productions